Hell's Horizon is a 1955 American war film directed by Tom Gries. The film stars John Ireland and Marla English. Hell's Horizon recounts the story of a bomber crew in the Korean War.

Plot
During the Korean War, United States Air Force Captain John Merrill (John Ireland) is the pilot of a Boeing B-29 Superfortress bomber. Merrill is based in Okinawa and is ordered to destroy a Yalu River bridge in Korea. The mission is continually delayed due to bad weather. His co-pilot (Bill Williams) has to step in when the bored and frustrated crew members begin to fight over Sammi (Marla English), a local woman who is employed as a laundress at their base.

When the weather finally clears over the target, Merrill is ordered to attack the strategic bridge, but with only cloud cover as his protection. The North Koreans are prepared, and anti-aircraft guns hit the bomber as it descends out of the clouds. The attack is a success, but some crew members are killed, including "Jockey" (Chet Baker), the popular trumpeter of the base. Others on board are wounded. Merrill has to contend not only with the damaged bomber, but also flying through a deadly storm.

The bomber returns to base with extensive damage and only one engine still working, so Merrill has to make a "pancake" landing. The survivors make it back in time to hear the announcement of Sammi's engagement to one of the crew, Sgt. "Buddy" Lewis (Larry Pennell).

Cast
 John Ireland as Capt. John Merrill
 Marla English as Sammi
 Bill Williams as Paul Jenkins
 Hugh Beaumont as Sgt. Al Trask
 Larry Pennell as Sgt. "Buddy" Lewis
 Chet Baker as "Jockey"

Production
Hell's Horizon relied on a large amount of stock footage.

Reception
Despite its release only a few years after the end of the Korean War, Hell's Horizon was no more than a typical B war film. Reviewer Alun Evans summed it up as a "standard action drama of a single bomber raid in the Korean conflict with no redeeming features." In Leonard Maltin's review, he merely noted, "Interaction among men of bombing squad in the Korean War."

See also
List of American films of 1955

Notes

References

Bibliography
 Evans, Alun. Brassey's Guide to War Films. Dulles, Virginia: Potomac Books, 2000. .

External links
 
 

1955 films
1955 war films
American war films
American aviation films
American black-and-white films
Films directed by Tom Gries
Korean War aviation films
Columbia Pictures films
1950s English-language films
1950s American films